The Philippines' history with the World Bank started in 1945 when they became one of the first members of the International Bank for Reconstruction and Development (IBRD). Their first project with the Bank came in 1957 with the Binga Power Project. Since then, the Philippines has received $2.14 billion of disbursed loans from the IBRD. The Philippines is in the constituency entitled EDS 15, comprising Brazil, Colombia, Dominican Republic, Ecuador, Haiti, Panama, Suriname, and Trinidad and Tobago, and headed by Executive Director Fabio Kanczuk.

Economic overview of the Philippines 

According to World Bank data, the Philippines is considered to be a "lower middle income" country, defined as countries that have a per capita GNI between $1,026 and $3,995. As of 2018, by gross domestic product Purchasing Power Parity (GDP PPP), the Philippines is ranked 27th in the world with a GDP PPP of 952,967 international dollars. In the same year, by nominal gross domestic product (GDP), the Philippines is ranked 38th in the world with a GDP of $330,910 (US dollars). The economy relies mostly on the service sector (59.8% in 2017), with smaller percentages in industry (30.6% in 2017) and agriculture (9.6% in 2017). 

The Philippines has remained generally unsusceptible to global economic shocks. This is because of less exposure to problematic international securities, lower export dependence, stable domestic consumption, large remittances from overseas Filipinos, and a quickly growing service industry. Economic growth has been positive and stable, averaging 6.3% between 2010 and 2018 and 4.5% between 2000 and 2009. Additionally, the country is expected to become an upper-middle country in the near future, as its per capita income of $3,660 USD is just below the minimum bound of $3,896 USD.

History of the World Bank in the Philippines

Overview 
After becoming one of the members of the IBRD in 1945, the Philippines became a member of the International Development Association (IDA) in 1960. Two years later, the International Finance Committee (IFC) established the Private Development Corporation of the Philippines to help spur extensive private investment. By 1994, the Philippines became a member of the Multilateral Investment Guarantee Agency (MIGA). From 2015 to 2018, the Philippines and the World Bank engaged in the Country Partnership Strategy to create better jobs, increase shared prosperity, and eradicate extreme poverty.

Notable Projects 
Roughly half of World Bank projects in the Philippines have centered around rural infrastructure, private sector infrastructure, climate change, and civic engagement. The Binga Power Project in 1957 marked the first World Bank Project in the Philippines. The project helped satisfy demand for electricity on the island of Luzon by providing four 25 MW generators, a rock filled dam that stores a reservoir, a 90 meter wide spillway that handles flood water, an underground powerhouse with surge chambers, and a pressure tunnel to deal with water flow. In 1966, the World Bank/IBRD committed $25 million for the Private Development Corporation of the Philippines Project 2, which provided loans to stimulate productive private enterprises. The Magat River Multipurpose Project in 1978 was the most expensive project of the 1970s at $150 million and provided a dam, tunnels, and reservoir resettlement. After continued development throughout the 20th century and into the 21st century, the Philippines suffered a setback in 2013 when Typhoon Haiyan struck. The World Bank stepped in and contributed $500 million for recovery efforts. In line with its history of attempting to reduce poverty, the Philippines most recently accepting a $300 million loan for the Pantawid Pamilyang Pilipino Program, a conditional cash transfer program.

Effects and Controversy 
In the 21st century, World Bank intervention in the Philippines has improved social and living conditions. The Philippine Rural Development Project of 2015 raised rural incomes, increased agricultural productivity, and improved market access in rural areas. The effects go beyond rural infrastructure. From an educational perspective, the Learning, Equity, and Accountability Program Support (LEAPS) benefitted 4.4 million students and recorded improvements in the reading and math scores of students in Grades 2 and 3.

World Bank intervention in the Philippines has also been met with controversy. The World Bank has been criticized by the Committee for the Abolition of Illegitimate Debt for its role in funding the regime of Ferdinand Marcos. Structural adjustment loans given to the Philippines mostly ended up in the hands of the Marcos administration instead of being used to fund export-driven industrialization, with the corruption fueling a banking crisis that discouraged foreign private investors from investing in the Philippines.

Future 
Economic growth in 2020 and 2021 is forecasted to shrink to 6.1% and 6.2% (from 6.5% in both years), respectively, due to a slowdown in public investment and the current China–United States trade war. Additionally, the Philippines and the World Bank have set goals for the Philippines by 2040. By that time, the Philippines wants to be free from poverty and sustain a prosperous middle class. In order to do so, the World Bank estimates that income per capita must triple by way of having its economy grow at an average annual rate of 6.5%. In order to reach and maintain this level of growth, the World Bank recommends that the Philippines improves market competition via reforms in regulation, simplifies regulations for trade, and reduces labor market costs and barriers.

References

World Bank
World Bank

World Bank Group relations